The Cologne Classical Ensemble (in German: Kölner Klassik Ensemble) was formed by graduates of the Hochschule für Musik Köln in 2003. With over 30 concerts per year it has become a renowned ensemble for classical music. Founder and Artistic Director of the ensemble is Tobias Kassung. The basic formation of the Cologne Classical Ensemble consists of three violins, viola, cello, double-bass, guitar and piano. Especially their recording of classical arrangements of music by Ástor Piazzolla for Sony Classical became popular.

References

External links
 
 Official website of the Cologne Classical Ensemble 
 Presentation of the Cologne Classical Ensemble at KSG Exaudio 

Chamber music groups
Music in Cologne